The  is a commuter electric multiple unit (EMU) train type operated by the private railway operator Kintetsu Railway since 1986. In 1987, it was awarded the Laurel Prize, presented annually by the Japan Railfan Club.

Operations
The 7000 series sets operate on Keihanna Line service, including through-running to and from the Osaka Municipal Subway Chūō Line.

Formations

Interior
Passenger accommodation consists of longitudinal bench seating throughout.

References

External links

 Kintetsu 7000 series train information 

Electric multiple units of Japan
7000 series
Train-related introductions in 1984
750 V DC multiple units
Kinki Sharyo multiple units